The white hot is a variation on the hot dog found primarily in the Rochester, NY area, as well as other parts of Western New York and Central New York.  It is composed of a combination of uncured and unsmoked pork, beef, and veal; the lack of smoking or curing allows the meat to retain a naturally white color. White hots usually contain mustard and other spices, and often include a dairy component such as nonfat dry milk.

History
The white hot originated in the 1920s in Rochester's German community as a "white and porky". It was originally a cheaper alternative to high-price red hot dogs, made of the less desirable meat parts and various fillers; in contrast, modern versions are made from quality meats and are generally sold at higher prices than common hot dogs.

One of the best-known producers of the white hot is Zweigle's. Although they were not the first to make white hots, they were the first to secure a contract at the Red Wing Stadium soon after Zweigle's began making the dogs in 1925. The white hot has become the official hot dog of the Buffalo Bills, Buffalo Sabres, Rochester Americans and Rochester Rhinos and was the official hot dog of the Washington Nationals during the major league baseball team's first season.

Another producer, Hofmann, produces white hots in the Syracuse, New York area under the name "Snappy Grillers". A third company, Hartmann, is also known to produce white hots.

See also
Weisswurst, an unrelated white German sausage made primarily from veal, traditional in Bavaria and popular in the mid-western United States
Hot dog variations
 List of hot dogs
 List of regional dishes of the United States

References

Hot dogs
Culture of Syracuse, New York
Culture of Rochester, New York
Cuisine of New York (state)
Cuisine of the Mid-Atlantic states